Iazychie was an artificial literary East Slavic language used in the 19th century and the early 20th century in Halychyna, Bukovina, and Zakarpattia in publishing,  particularly by Ukrainian and Carpatho-Rusyn Russophiles (Moskvophiles). It was an unsystematic combination of Russian with the lexical, phonetic and grammatical elements of vernacular Ukrainian and Rusyn, Church Slavonic, Ruthenian, Polish, and Old Slavic.

The term was introduced by Ukrainophiles, who used it pejoratively. Nikolay Chernyshevsky called "Iazychie" a mutilation of the language and sharply condemned it. Ivan Franko and other representatives of the contemporary territories of today's Western Ukraine's progressive intelligentsia also opposed "Iazychie". The proponents of the language themselves called it the "traditional Carpatho-Rusyn language". Russophiles saw it as a tool against Polish influence and a transition to Russian literary language, considering local dialects to be a "speech of swineherds and shepherds".

Text example
въ хмарнїи роки овощи николи не буваютъ смачни̂ та тревали̂. (1875)

References

External links
 Muromtseva, O. Iazychie. Izbornyk

East Slavic languages
Rusyns
Constructed languages introduced in the 19th century